Christophe Negrel (born May 25, 1977 in Marseille) is a French taekwondo practitioner, who competed in the men's welterweight category. He picked up a total of eight medals in his career, including three from the European Championships and a silver in the 70-kg division from the 1997 World Taekwondo Championships in Hong Kong, and attained a top eight finish at the 2004 Summer Olympics, representing his nation France. Throughout his sporting career, Negrel trained full-time for La Rose Boxing and Taekwondo Club in his native Marseilles, and also became a full-fledged member of the French taekwondo squad since 1996, under head coach and master Philippe Pinard.

Negrel started his sporting career by picking up a bronze medal at the 1994 European Junior Championships in Bucharest, Romania. Three years later, he made his official debut in the senior division and eventually claimed a silver in the 70-kg class at the 1997 World Taekwondo Championships in Hong Kong, losing the final to Egypt's Tamer Abdelmoneim Hussein. In 2003, Negrel reached the pinnacle of his sporting career, as he secured a gold medal victory over Iran's Yousef Karami and a spot on the French Olympic squad in the 80-kg class at the World Olympic Qualifying Tournament in Paris.

At the 2004 Summer Olympics in Athens, Negrel qualified for the French squad in the men's welterweight class (80 kg), by topping the field of fighters and granting a berth from the World Olympic Qualifying Tournament in Paris. As the top seeder of the prelim draw, Negrel opened his match with a powerful 13–10 victory over Dutch taekwondo jin Patrick Stevens before he fell in a stunning 17–24 defeat to Azerbaijan's Rashad Ahmadov in the quarterfinals.

References

External links

1977 births
Living people
French male taekwondo practitioners
Olympic taekwondo practitioners of France
Taekwondo practitioners at the 2004 Summer Olympics
Sportspeople from Marseille
European Taekwondo Championships medalists
World Taekwondo Championships medalists
21st-century French people